Domagoj Vuković (born October 29, 1993) is a Croatian professional basketball player currently playing for Cibona of the Croatian League and ABA League. Standing at  2.07 m, he plays at the power forward position.

A native of Rijeka, he started playing basketball in his home town clubs before joining the Nikola Vujčić Academy. His first professional contract was with Split. After playing for Split, Zagreb and Zabok in August 2016 he joined another A-1 Liga team: Vrijednosnice Osijek. After spending a season there in August 2017 he moved to Zadar. After averaging 10 points and 7.5 rebounds per game during the 2019-20 season, Vuković had his contract with Zadar extended for two years on May 20, 2020.

In April, 2022, Vuković fell to an injury of his achilles tendon which kept him off the court for more than six months. In November, 2022, Vuković signed with Cibona of the Croatian League and ABA League.

Croatian national team
He was a member of the youth Croatia national basketball team selections and played at the 2011 FIBA Europe Under-18 Championship and 2012 FIBA Europe Under-20 Championship (Division B).

In 2018 he was called up for the senior B selection that played the Stankovic Cup in China.

References

External links
 Adriatic League Profile
 RealGM Profile

1993 births
Living people
ABA League players
Croatian men's basketball players
KK Zadar players
Basketball players from Rijeka
KK Zagreb players
KK Split players
KK Zabok players
KK Vrijednosnice Osijek players
Power forwards (basketball)
KK Cibona players